Leggo is a ghost town in Yalobusha County, Mississippi, United States.

Leggo gained fame due to a mineral well located nearby.

History
W.B. Ford moved from South Carolina to Mississippi after the Civil War.  Ford dug a well to supply water to his livestock, but his cattle would not drink it due to its high mineral content.  The water from "Ford's Well" was believed to have medicinal properties, and the community of Leggo developed a short distance south of the well.

Leggo flourished as a health resort, and many people would visit Leggo annually to use Ford's water.  Ford also sold his water throughout the southeastern United States.

Leggo had a school, a post office, and an excellent hotel.

Leggo today is covered by forest.  The Ford's Well Church and Cemetery are located north of the former settlement.

References

Former populated places in Yalobusha County, Mississippi
Former populated places in Mississippi